The 1997 FA Cup final was the 116th final of the FA Cup. It took place on 17 May 1997 at Wembley Stadium and was contested by Chelsea and Middlesbrough, the North East club appearing in its first FA Cup Final.

Chelsea won 2–0 to win the FA Cup for the second time, the first having come in 1970. It was also the club's first major trophy in 26 years.

It was the first major honour in the career of most Chelsea's players, but for Mark Hughes, it was the fourth time that he had featured in an FA Cup winning side (having played on the winning Manchester United teams of 1985, 1990 and 1994). For Middlesbrough, it was a second final defeat of the 1996–97 season (having lost the League Cup Final to Leicester City the previous month), to go with their controversial relegation from the Premier League.

Road to Wembley

Match review
Chelsea took the lead just 42 seconds into the match, with Italian midfielder Roberto Di Matteo receiving the ball and firing it into the goal off the crossbar from 25 yards to record what was at the time the quickest ever goal in a Wembley FA Cup final (Louis Saha broke this record 12 years later in the 2009 final after just 25 seconds, coincidentally against Chelsea, though Chelsea won the match 2–1), breaking Jackie Milburn's 42-year record.
Middlesbrough's prolific striker Fabrizio Ravanelli limped off after 21 minutes, further diminishing his side's chances of victory. Late in the first half Gianluca Festa put the ball in the net for Middlesbrough, but the goal was  controversially ruled out for offside. In a largely disappointing match, in which Chelsea were generally in control, Chelsea eventually added a second goal seven minutes from full-time with Eddie Newton steering the ball into the net from Gianfranco Zola's clever flick to seal a 2–0 win.

Match details

See also
 Blue Day (Chelsea song, with Suggs) 
 Let's Dance (Middlesbrough song, with Bob Mortimer)

References

External links
Game facts at soccerbase.com

Final
FA Cup Finals
FA Cup Final 1997
FA Cup Final 1997
FA Cup Final
FA Cup Final